Clayton Doley (born 13 September 1974) is an Australian musician, singer, songwriter, television musical director, arranger, and record producer best known for his Hammond Organ virtuosity.

Songwriter and producer
As a songwriter Clayton has had his works recorded by The Whitlams, Jimmy Barnes, Mahalia Barnes, Jade MacRae, Ngaiire and Kara Grainger. 
He has produced tracks for Jimmy Barnes' platinum selling Double Happiness album and Jade MacRae's ARIA award-winning self-titled debut.
Doley is credited with writing string arrangements as well as co-producing Harry Manx's 2017 release Faith Lift.

Session musician
As a recording session musician Clayton is most often credited as playing the Hammond Organ and is sometimes listed as Clayton Dooley. He also performs on a wide variety of keyboard instruments and has been credited with playing piano, wurlitzer, rhodes, clavinet and mellotron. He has played on albums for artists such as Harry Manx, Joe Bonamassa, A Camp (Sweden), Eugene "Hideaway" Bridges (USA), Jimmy Barnes, Renee Geyer, Billy Thorpe, The Whitlams, The Rockmellons, Adam Brand, Kasey Chambers, Alex Lloyd, Troy Cassar-Daley, James Blundell, Adam Harvey, Ed Kuepper, Slim Dusty, Beccy Cole, Felicity Urquhart, Rick Price, Tina Harrod, Jackie Orszaczky, Mahalia Barnes, Jade Macrae, Kevin Borich, Starlite Campbell Band to name a few.

Clayton played keyboards for the Netflix original animated series Beat Bugs released in 2016. IMDb lists him for all 26 episodes.

Tours
As a live session musician, Clayton has played for Steve Cropper and Donald "Duck" Dunn from Booker T and The MG's (USA), Larry Braggs and David Garibaldi from Tower of Power (USA), Joe Bonamassa (USA), The Divinyls, Nigel Kennedy (UK), Eugene "Hideaway" Bridges (USA), Harry Manx (Canada), Dan Aykroyd, Silverchair, Billy Thorpe, Jon Stevens, Vanessa Amorosi, Guy Sebastian, Jimmy Barnes, Ian Moss, Russell Morris, Renee Geyer, The Whitlams, Mica Paris (UK), Margie Evans (USA), Louisiana Red (USA), Mojo Buford (USA), Hubert Sumlin (USA), Guitar Shorty (USA), Jenny Morris, Mia Dyson, James Morrison, Don Burrows, Adam Brand, Deborah Conway, Marcia Hines, Deni Hines, Disco Montego. 
At 16 he joined Adelaide blues band Double Whammy and at 18 he joined Sydney band The Mighty Reapers, and has since started his own bands The Hands and Clayton Doley's Organ Donors.
He has opened for James Brown, BB King, Buddy Guy and Junior Wells, Albert Collins, Albert King, Georgie Fame, Maceo Parker, Jon Cleary, Bon Jovi, Cheap Trick, Ronan Keating,

Band leader
In 2002 Clayton and his brother Lachlan formed soul band The Hands, driven by the dueling keyboards of Clayton on Hammond Organ and Lachlan Doley on Hohner D6 Clavinet. The Hands have recorded two albums of original songs, "Live and Breathe" in 2004 and "Everything Is Wonderful" in 2008.

In 2006 Clayton Doley's Organ Donors was formed with longtime friends and fellow musicians Jak Housden on guitar (Badloves), James Haselwood on bass, and Dave Hibbard (also from The Hands) on drums. They regularly performed on the Australian festival circuit and have been referred to as Australia's answer to Booker T and the MG's. In 2010 Clayton Doley's Organ Donors released the critically acclaimed instrumental album on Sundazed called Tension.

In 2012 Clayton Doley released his debut album as a solo artist, Desperate Times, an organ trio album recorded in Canada. The organ trio known as The Clayton Doley Organ Experience held down a successful residency gig at the Orbit Room in Toronto and performed mainly in Canada and Australia.

In 2015 Clayton Doley released his second album as a solo artist called Bayou Billabong. The album was recorded in both New Orleans, Louisiana, and Sydney, Australia, with past and present members of Jon Cleary (musician)'s band, The Absolute Monster Gentlemen as the rhythm section. It also features marching band brass from The Treme Funktet with members of Galactic and Trombone Shorty's Orleans Avenue. Australian backing vocalists Mahalia Barnes, Jade MacRae and Juanita Tippins (The Clay-Tones) feature heavily throughout and also appearing is didgeridoo player Ganga Giri and Canadian lap slide guitar player Harry Manx. In the week of its release, Bayou Billabong made it to Number 1 both in the iTunes Blues Charts and the US Roots Music Report Blues Chart and stayed in the Australian Blues and Roots Airplay Charts six months after its release.

Musical director for television
As has worked as a television musical director for such shows as Good News Week broadcast on Network 10, The Sideshow broadcast on the ABC network, Melbourne International Comedy Festival (MICF) Opening Night Gala 2009 and 2010 broadcast on Network 10 and musical director for The Great Debate 2011 broadcast on Network 10.

References

External links
 claytondoley.com

1974 births
Living people
Australian organists
Male organists
Australian singer-songwriters
The Dead Daisies members
Divinyls members
21st-century Australian singers
21st-century organists
21st-century Australian male singers
Australian male singer-songwriters